The following is a list of events affecting American television in 2021. Events listed include television show debuts, finales, and cancellations; channel launches, closures, and re-brandings; stations changing or adding their network affiliations; and information about controversies and carriage disputes.

Notable events

January

February

March

April

May

June

July

August

September

October

November

December

Television shows

Shows debuting in 2021

Shows changing networks

Milestone episodes and anniversaries

Shows returning in 2021
The following shows returned with new episodes after being canceled or having ended their run previously:

Shows ending in 2021

Entering syndication in 2021
A list of programs (current or canceled) that have accumulated enough episodes (between 65 and 100) or seasons (three or more) to be eligible for off-network syndication and/or basic cable runs.

Networks and services

Launches

Conversions and rebrandings

Closures

Television stations

Subchannel launches

Stations changing network affiliations

This section outlines affiliation changes involving English and Spanish networks (ABC, NBC, CBS, Fox, PBS, The CW, Univision, etc.), and format conversions involving independent stations. Digital subchannels are mentioned if the prior or new affiliation involves a major English and Spanish broadcast network or a locally programmed independent entertainment format.

Scripps, Ion, and Inyo 2021 subchannel shifts

Station closures

Deaths

January

February

March

April

May

June

July

August

September

October

November

December

See also
 Impact of the COVID-19 pandemic on television in the United States

Notes

References

External links
List of 2021 American television series at IMDb